Theatres and entertainment venues in Lyon, France includes present-day opera houses and theatres, cabarets, music halls and other places of live entertainment.

The list is by name in alphabetical order, but it can be resorted by address, arrondissement, opening date (of the building, not the performing company), number of seats (main + secondary stage), or main present-day function. It excludes theatrical companies, outdoor venues, churches in which concerts are performed, museums and libraries. Former names of the theatre (again the building, not the performing company) are included in the notes.

External links and references
  culture.lyon.fr, the cultural portal of the City of Lyon
  evene.fr, database
Theatres, LyonLyon
Lyon
Lyon

Culture in Lyon
Theatres